Luwalaje, also known as Lualaje, is an administrative ward in the Chunya district of the Mbeya Region of Tanzania. 

In 2016 the Tanzania National Bureau of Statistics report there were 4,745 people in the ward, from 4,305 in 2012.

Villages / vitongoji 
The ward has 2 villages and 14 vitongoji.

 Lualaje
 Ikingo
 Itete
 Kabuta
 Kiseru
 Kitakwa
 Mpembe Magh.
 Muungano
 Sumbwe
 Mwiji
 Isote
 Mtakuja
 Mwiji A
 Mwiji B
 Mwiji C
 Mwiji D

References 

Wards of Mbeya Region